Air New Zealand Link was a brand name under which Air New Zealand's subsidiary regional airlines operated flights. They primarily connected regional centres with New Zealand's three main international airports, Auckland Airport, Wellington International Airport, and Christchurch International Airport. The regional airlines have since been combined with their parent Air New Zealand. They were Mount Cook Airline, Air Nelson and Eagle Airways.

History
Air New Zealand Link was formed as the brand name for regional services in 1991, covering the three airlines Air New Zealand had purchased interests in: Eagle Airways, Mount Cook Airline and Air Nelson. The three airlines were purchased as Air New Zealand found it not viable to operate its own regional services due to the introduction of new competition, Ansett New Zealand.

The airlines were purchased as below:
 Mount Cook Airline: Initial stake purchased by NAC in 1973, increased to 30% on 5 December 1983, 77% in October 1985, and 100% on 18 April 1991.
 Air Nelson: 50% stake purchased by Air New Zealand in October 1988, increased to 100% in 1995.
 Eagle Airways: 50% stake purchased by Air New Zealand in October 1988, which increased to 100% in 1995. Its operations ended in 2016.

Fleet
As of 30 April 2019 the Air New Zealand Link carriers operated the following aircraft.

Destinations

As of June 2019 Air New Zealand Link flies to the following destinations.

References

Air New Zealand